Nehal (Persian: نهال, pronounced næhāl, नेहल) is a Middle Eastern name. It has a variety of meanings in different languages, such as; rainy, loving, intelligent, genius, spring, or beautiful.
The name 'Nehal' is derived from Persian, meaning "newly planted tree". 
It is a popular Persian name which metaphorically refers to the personal attributes of beauty and youth and which, in its literal form, means "little tree". In Arabic, Nehal is a collective word. It relates to water from springs, essentially meaning 'source of life'. As a name, it symbolises the fact or the will to drink from the source of knowledge. Therefore, the meaning of "Nehal" is "eager to get knowledge". Nehal also means beautiful, handsome, and intelligent. In the Indian language of Punjabi, the name Nahal means, "happy". The name 'Nehal' is originally derived from Sanskrit, meaning "born during the period of intelligence".

Notable individuals with the name include:
Nehal Bibodi, Indian-Ugandan cricketer
Nehal Chudasama, Indian model
Nehal Hashmi, Pakistani lawyer and politician
Nehal N. Mehta, American cardiologist
Nehal Saafan, Egyptian synchronized swimmer

References

Arabic feminine given names
Gujarati given names
Indian unisex given names